is a former racing driver from Japan.

Career
Mitsusada began competing in Japanese Formula Three in 1991 with Now Motor Sports and secured a podium in his first season with the team. By 1993, he continued to race with the team and won his first race, along with a further four podium finishes. He finished 4th in the championship, and represented the team at the 1993 Macau Grand Prix. In 1994, he graduated to Formula Nippon and drove for DOME. In 1995, he continued racing in Formula Nippon now for Team 5Zigen, and also raced for Toyota Team Cerumo in the Japanese Touring Car Championship. In that series he secured 57 points and 2 podium finishes driving their Toyota Corona. In 1996, Mitsusada made his debut at the 24 Hours of Le Mans, racing for Team SARD Toyota Co Ltd in their Toyota Supra. He also raced for the first time in Super GT with the Toyota Castrol Team, having close battles with the Lark McLaren F1. A return to Formula Nippon in the same year followed, again with Team 5Zigen, however over the 10 races he scored no points. For 1997, he switched to Cosmo Team Cerumo and saw greater success with three podium finishes and 4th place in the championship.

For 1998, Mitsusada moved away from Japan to compete in the final three rounds of the Formula 3000 International Championship with Nordic Racing. His best result came in the final round of the season with a 15th place finish. He returned to Japan for 1999, and once again competed in Formula Nippon this time with Nakajima Racing. He finished the season in 3rd place, collecting 2 wins and 31 points along the way. He also raced for the team three times in Super GT, winning 1 race.

In 2000, Mitsusada was appointed official test driver for the Benetton Formula One team. He would support the drivers developing the B200 race car. Alongside this, he was confirmed to race for World Racing Team in the Formula 3000 International Championship. However, he failed to qualify for any of the first three races and was dropped from his race seat and Benetton test role. He returned to compete in Super GT, now with DOME and secured 2 podium finishes. He also competed in the 1000km Suzuka race. Across 2001 and 2002, Mitsusada continued to race across both Formula Nippon and Super GT.

In 2003, he switched attention purely to the Super GT series. He finished the season in 20th, driving the Raybrig Honda NSX. In 2004, he switched teams to Hitotsuyama Racing where he would stay until the end of 2005 racing their Ferrari 550 Maranello.  Between 2006 and 2008, Mitsusada switched from GT500 to the GT300 class, initially with DHG Racing racing their Ford GT. He secured 1 podium finish in the first season, on his way to 16th in the championship. For his final two seasons, Mitsusada raced the Arktech Motorsports teams Porsche Boxster, finishing 15th and 26th in each season respectively.

In 2013, Mitsusada launched Team MPR a karting team he manages.

Racing record

Japanese Top Formula Championship results

Complete Formula 3000 results

Complete Japanese Touring Car Championship results
(key) (Races in bold indicate pole position) (Races in italics indicate fastest lap)

Complete JGTC/Super GT results 
(key) (Races in bold indicate pole position) (Races in italics indicate fastest lap)

External links
Driver DB Profile

References

Living people
1970 births
Japanese racing drivers
International Formula 3000 drivers
Japanese Formula 3000 Championship drivers
Formula Nippon drivers
Japanese Formula 3 Championship drivers
Super GT drivers
Japanese Touring Car Championship drivers
24_Hours_of_Le_Mans_drivers
People from Osaka Prefecture

Dandelion Racing drivers
Nakajima Racing drivers
Mugen Motorsports drivers
Team Kunimitsu drivers
Nordic Racing drivers
TOM'S drivers